Prince Island is located in the Ord River in the Kimberley region of Western Australia.

References

Islands of the Kimberley (Western Australia)